The Cozancea is a left tributary of the river Sitna in Romania. It flows into the Sitna in Cernești.

References

Rivers of Romania
Rivers of Botoșani County